This list of notable people associated with Bennington College includes matriculating students, alumni, attendees, faculty, trustees, and honorary degree recipients of Bennington College in Bennington, Vermont.

Notable alumni

Architecture

Art administration

Aviation

Business

Dance/choreography

Education

Film/theater/television

Government/public service

Journalism/broadcasting

Music

Science/medicine

Sports

Visual arts

Writing

Fictional characters

Notable current faculty
 Benjamin Anastas
 April Bernard
 Kitty Brazelton
 J Stoner Blackwell
 Brian Campion
 Susan Cheever
 Franny Choi
 Annabel Davis-Goff
 Michael Dumanis
 Anaïs Duplan
 Marguerite Feitlowitz
 Monica Ferrell
 David Gates
 Mariam Ghani
 Amy Hempel
 Sherry Kramer
 Dinah Lenney
 Jen Liu
 Mary Lum
 Ann Pibal
 Lynne Sharon Schwartz
 Allen Shawn
 Craig Morgan Teicher
 Mark Wunderlich

Notable former faculty
 Kathleen Alcott: novelist
 W. H. Auden: gave a series of lectures on Shakespeare in the spring of 1946; resided in the Leigh house faculty apartment
 Steven Bach
 Ben Belitt: poet and language professor
 Eric Bentley
 Henry Brant: composer
 Kenneth Burke: critic
 Louis Calabro: composer
 Sir Anthony Caro: British sculptor
 Ronald L. Cohen: psychologist
 Bernard Cooper; novelist
 Nicholas Delbanco: novelist and director of the Bennington Writers' Workshop
 Bill Dixon: musician
 Peter Drucker: management guru and writer
 Paul Feeley: painter
 Francis Fergusson: French scholar and translator
 Vivian Fine: composer
 Claude Fredericks:  poet
 Buckminster Fuller
 John Gardner: novelist
 Martha Graham: dancer
 Milford Graves: musician
 Lucy Grealy: poet and writer
 Clement Greenberg: art critic and historian
 Richard Haas: artist
 Edward Hoagland: writer
 Stanley Edgar Hyman: literary critic (whose wife Shirley Jackson used settings in and around Bennington College in her famous short story "The Lottery")
 Susie Ibarra: musician
 Lyman Kipp: sculptor
 Stanley Kunitz:  poet
 Ronnie Landfield: painter, (guest instructor) 1968
 Mac Maharaj: South African politician
 Bernard Malamud: novelist
 Harry Mathews: poet, novelist, essayist
 Donald McKayle: dancer and choreographer
 Roland Merullo: author
 Howard Nemerov:  poet
 Kenneth Noland: painter
 Jules Olitski: painter
 Mary Oliver: poet
 Camille Paglia: critic
 Gail Thain Parker President and author.
 Wendy Perron: dancer/choreographer
 John Plumb: painter
 Mark Poirier: novelist and short story writer
 Larry Poons: painter
 Theodore Roethke: poet
 Mary Ruefle: poet
 Joel Shapiro: New York sculptor
 Brando Skyhorse: novelist
 Barbara Herrnstein Smith: professor and author
 David Smith: sculptor
 Glen Van Brummelen: historian of mathematics, former president of Canadian Society for History and Philosophy of Mathematics: founding faculty member of Quest University
 Phillip B. Williams: poet
 Isaac Witkin: sculptor
 Robert Woodworth: botanist and pioneer of time-lapse photography

References

Bennington College people
 
Bennington College
People by university or college in Vermont